Liolaemus chillanensis, the peak tree iguana, is a species of lizard in the family  Liolaemidae. It is native to Chile and Argentina.

References

chillanensis
Reptiles described in 1932
Reptiles of Chile
Reptiles of Argentina
Taxa named by Lorenz Müller
Taxa named by Walter Hellmich